The Klamath Basin National Wildlife Refuge Complex is a wildlife preserve operated by the United States Fish and Wildlife Service in the Klamath Basin of southern Oregon and northern California near Klamath Falls, Oregon. It consists of Bear Valley, 
Klamath Marsh and Upper Klamath National Wildlife Refuge (NWR) in southern Oregon and Lower Klamath, Tule Lake, and Clear Lake NWR in northern California.

Lower Klamath NWR, established in 1908, was the first waterfowl refuge in the United States. Consisting of 46,900 acre (190 km2), it includes shallow freshwater marshes, open water, grassy uplands, and croplands that are intensively managed to provide feeding, resting, nesting, and brood rearing  habitat for waterfowl and other water birds.

About  is open water. The balance is the surrounding upland habitat of bunchgrass, low  sagebrush, and juniper.

Tule Lake NWR, established in 1928, encompasses  of mostly open water and croplands.

Bear Valley NWR, established in 1978, protects a vital night roost site for wintering bald eagles.

Historically, the Klamath Basin was dominated by approximately 185,000 acres (749 km2) of shallow lakes and freshwater marshes. these extensive wetlands attracted peak fall concentrations of over 6 million waterfowl and supported abundant populations of other water birds including American white pelican, double-crested cormorant, and several heron species.

In 1905, the U.S. Bureau of Reclamation initiated the Klamath Reclamation Project to convert the lakes and marshes of the Lower Klamath Lake and Tule Lake areas to agricultural lands. As these wetlands receded, the reclaimed lands were opened to agricultural development and settlement. Today, less than 25% of the historic wetlands remain.

To conserve much of the Basin's remaining wetland habitat, the six National Wildlife Refuges have been established. The U.S. Fish and Wildlife Service manages these Refuges to enhance wildlife and benefit the American people. Agricultural and water programs are coordinated under an agreement between the Fish and Wildlife Service and the Bureau of Reclamation.

Klamath Basin Refuges consist of a variety of habitats including freshwater marshes, open water, grassy meadows, coniferous forests, sagebrush and juniper grasslands, agricultural lands, and rocky cliffs and slopes. These habitats support diverse and abundant populations of resident and migratory wildlife with 433 species having been observed on or near the Refuges. In addition, each year the Refuges serve as a migratory stopover for about three-quarters of the Pacific Flyway waterfowl, with peak fall concentrations of over 1 million birds. The Klamath Refuge has been described as "the heartbeat of the Pacific Flyway".

Units include

 Bear Valley National Wildlife Refuge
 Clear Lake National Wildlife Refuge
 Klamath Marsh National Wildlife Refuge
 Lower Klamath National Wildlife Refuge
 Tule Lake National Wildlife Refuge
 Upper Klamath National Wildlife Refuge

See also 
 List of National Wildlife Refuges

References

External links 

 Klamath Basin National Refuge Complex website
 Klamath Waters Digital Library

National Wildlife Refuges in California
National Wildlife Refuges in Oregon
Wetlands of Oregon
Protected areas of Klamath County, Oregon
Protected areas of Modoc County, California
Protected areas of Siskiyou County, California
1908 establishments in Oregon
Wetlands of California
Landforms of Klamath County, Oregon
Landforms of Modoc County, California
Landforms of Siskiyou County, California
Protected areas established in 1908
1908 establishments in California